Lee Lin Chin (born 1948) is an Indonesian-born Australian television, radio presenter and journalist. She is best known for her association with the Special Broadcasting Service (SBS) network, and presented SBS World News on weekends. 

Lee Lin has been a news presenter and journalist since the late 1960s and has become popular throughout social media. 

In 2016, she was nominated for the Gold Logie becoming the first SBS personality to be nominated for the award in the station's 36-year run.

Early life
Chin was born in Jakarta, Indonesia to Chinese parents and grew up in Singapore, where her media career began in television and radio in 1968.

Media career in Australia 

Chin migrated to Australia in 1980 where she began working for SBS TV as a translator for Chinese language films. Wanting to return to broadcasting, Chin moved to ABC Radio in both Newcastle and Darwin. In 1987, Chin moved to SBS World News, presenting the weekend news, where she remained until her retirement in 2018.

Chin has had many roles throughout her career, including news reading, research, reporting, interviews, selecting and programming music, voice-overs for commercials, and producing in-flight programmes for international airlines.

Chin has also starred in a minor role as a newsreader in the independent Australian movie Resistance by Hugh Keays-Byrne. She also had a small role, playing a Thai interpreter, in the 1989 Australian mini-series Bangkok Hilton, with Nicole Kidman.

More recently, Chin has been involved in creating small segments for SBS's The Feed where she presents small comedy segments including "Pranked with Lee Lin Chin", "Lee Lin Chin Versus Maggie Beer", "Celebrity Chin Wag", comedic cooking show "Lee Linguine" and most recently "The Real Newsreaders of Sydney" with fellow newsreaders Sandra Sully and Natalie Barr.

On 18 May 2015, she was announced to be Australia's spokesperson for the 2015 Eurovision Song Contest. She gave the "all-important" twelve points to the eventual winner, Sweden's Måns Zelmerlöw and his song "Heroes". She returned to this role in 2016 and gave twelve points to Belgium's Laura Tesoro and her song "What's the Pressure", and also the following year, where the twelve points were awarded to the United Kingdom's Lucie Jones with her song "Never Give Up On You". In 2018, she was replaced in this role by Ricardo Goncalves.

On 6 August 2015, The Sydney Morning Herald revealed that the tweets posted on Chin's official Twitter account were ghostwritten by comedian Chris Leben, head comedy writer for The Feed. It is unclear how much of an input Chin actually has in overseeing the account, however, an SBS spokesperson insists that Chin "has to see everything that goes out in her name". Chin's depiction on The Feed and social media are more or less an exaggeration of herself that are "inspired by" her personality. An SBS insider states that Chin "can be quite funny, which she is never allowed to be on the news". They believe the key to her success is that "people get to see something they don't usually get to see".

In July 2018, Chin announced her resignation stating that "...working two days a week didn't give me enough time to devote to the pub and re-reading the complete works of Shakespeare. So now that I work zero days that issue has been addressed."

In October 2018, Chin was placed number 74 on Maxim magazine's Hot 100 list.

Personal life
Chin enjoys travelling and reading, William Faulkner being a particular passion of hers. She is a lover of music, a photographer, a serious film buff and an avid beer enthusiast. Chin speaks conversational Cantonese, Mandarin and Hokkien.

References

External links

Special Broadcasting Service
Australian television presenters
Australian women television presenters
Australian reporters and correspondents
Australian people of Chinese descent
Indonesian people of Chinese descent
People from Jakarta
Living people
Year of birth missing (living people)
Indonesian emigrants to Australia